NGC 6569 is a globular cluster in the constellation Sagittarius. It has an apparent magnitude of about 9.5, and an apparent diameter of 7 arc minutes, and class VIII with stars of magnitude 15 and dimmer. It is about 2 degrees south east of Gamma2 Sagittarii. The globular cluster was discovered in 1784 by the astronomer William Herschel with his 18.7-inch telescope and was catalogued later in the New General Catalogue.

References

External links 
 

Globular clusters
Sagittarius (constellation)
6569